A Good Day to Die is a 2010 American documentary film about American Indian Movement founder Dennis Banks.

References

External links 

A Good Day to Die at Rotten Tomatoes

2010 films
American documentary films
Documentary films about Native Americans
2010s English-language films
2010s American films